Colin Ogilvie Buchanan (born 8 August 1934) is a British retired Anglican bishop and academic who specialised in liturgy. He served as the Principal of St John's College, Nottingham (1979–1985), the Bishop of Aston (1985–1989), and the Bishop of Woolwich (1996–2004).

Early life and education
Buchanan was born on 8 August 1934 to Prof. Robert Ogilvie Buchanan and Kathleen Mary Buchanan (née Parnell). He was educated at Whitgift School, then an all-boys direct grant grammar school. He studied Literae Humaniores at Lincoln College, Oxford, graduating with a second class Bachelor of Arts (BA) degree; as per tradition, his BA was later promoted to a Master of Arts (MA Oxon) degree. In 1959, he entered Tyndale Hall, Bristol, an Evangelical Anglican theological college, to train for ordained ministry.

In 1993, Buchanan was awarded a Lambeth Doctor of Divinity (DD) degree.

Ordained ministry
Buchanan was ordained in the Church of England as a deacon in 1961 and as a priest in 1962. From 1961 to 1964, he served his curacy in the benefice of Cheadle (St Cuthbert and St Mary) in the Diocese of Chester.

In 1964, Buchanan joined the London College of Divinity (later known as St John's College, Nottingham), where he would spend the next 21 years working. He was the librarian from 1964 to 1969, the registrar from 1969 to 1974, director of studies from 1974 to 1975, vice-principal from 1975 to 1978, and finally principal from 1979 to 1985. During this time, he was also a tutor in liturgy at the college, and he was a member of the Church of England's Liturgical Commission from 1964 to 1986. From 1981 to 1985, he was an honorary canon of Southwell Minster.

In 1985, Buchanan was consecrated as a bishop. From 1985 to 1989, he served as the Bishop of Aston, a suffragan bishop in the Diocese of Birmingham. He was an assistant bishop of the Diocese of Rochester from 1989 to 1996, and of the Diocese of Southwark from 1990 to 1991. He served as a member of the House of Bishops of the General Synod from 1990 to 2004. He was also Vicar of St Mark's Church, Gillingham between 1991 and 1996. He then returned to the episcopate on a full-time basis and served as the Bishop of Woolwich, an area bishop of the Diocese of Southwark, from 1996 to 2004. 

In July 2004, Buchanan retired from full-time ministry. He was an honorary assistant bishop in the Diocese of Bradford from 2004 to 2014, and of the Diocese of Ripon and Leeds from 2005 to 2014. Since 2015, he has been an honorary assistant bishop in the Diocese of Leeds, and he is based in the Bradford Episcopal Area.

Personal life
In 1963, Buchanan married. Together they have two children.

Selected works

  
  
  
  
  
 
 
 
 Buchanan Colin O. (2013) St John's Nottingham - from Northwood to Nottingham - a History of 50 Years 1963-2013 by Colin Buchanan, Published by St John's College, Nottingham, 2013 ISBN 978-1-900920-22-3

References

1934 births
People educated at Whitgift School
Alumni of Lincoln College, Oxford
Fellows of Corpus Christi College, Oxford
Bishops of Aston
Bishops of Woolwich
20th-century Church of England bishops
21st-century Church of England bishops
Holders of a Lambeth degree
Living people
Anglican liturgists
Staff of St John's College, Nottingham